is a Japanese former racing driver. He is a five-time Japanese Top Formula champion, and was the first full-time Japanese Formula One driver. Accordingly, he is responsible for several firsts for Japanese drivers in Formula One, including being the first to score championship points (at the 1987 San Marino Grand Prix, where he finished sixth in only his second F1 race), and being the first to record a fastest lap (at the 1989 Australian Grand Prix).

Early life
Nakajima was born into a farming family living just outside Okazaki, Japan.  He began driving cars in his early teens in the family's garden with his older brother giving him tips, careful that their father didn't catch them. He felt  exhilaration behind the wheel of a car, and from then on knew what he wanted to do.

Career
He started racing after he finished school and passed his driver's licence. In 1973 he was a rookie in the Suzuka Circuit series, which he won.  Five years later, he won his first race in Japanese Formula Two. In 1981 he won his first championship, thus beginning a period of domination in the series. He won five of the next six championships, all of them equipped with a Honda V6 engine.

Nakajima participated in 80 Formula One Grands Prix, debuting in the Brazilian Grand Prix on 12 April 1987, bringing Honda engines to the Lotus team. He was 34 years old in his debut race, making him one of Formula One's oldest debutants of the modern era. He finished sixth, and so scored a point, in only his second race, the 1987 San Marino Grand Prix. During his debut season, Nakajima was outclassed by his team mate Ayrton Senna, and many questioned Nakajima's place in F1, stating that if not for Honda he would not have been there on merit.

Honda had originally pushed for Nakajima to replace Nigel Mansell at Williams for the  season (the Japanese company supplied their engines exclusively to Williams from 1984–86). However, Williams owner Frank Williams refused to dump Mansell, who had won his first two races towards the end of the  season. Frank Williams, who was always more interested in the Constructors' rather than the Drivers' Championship, reasoned that having race winner Mansell, and then dual World Champion Nelson Piquet, would give the team its best shot at the Constructors' title, and that the unproven (in F1) Nakajima would struggle (Williams was to be proven correct on this). Lotus were looking for a new engine partner for 1987 as Renault were pulling out of the sport at the end of 1986. Lotus agreed to take on Nakajima replacing Johnny Dumfries in the second seat as a part of the new engine deal with Honda.

 was another miserable year in F1 for both Nakajima and Lotus. In the final season for turbos and using the same V6 engines that propelled McLaren drivers Senna and Alain Prost to win 15 of the season's 16 races, Nakajima scored only a single point during the season finishing sixth in the opening race in Brazil. Despite this, on occasions Nakajima was able to push his team mate, reigning World Champion Nelson Piquet who had replaced Senna.

Not normally the best of qualifiers or racers despite having equipment superior to most, including the same all-powerful Honda V6 turbo engine as the McLarens, Nakajima could have easily been excused for performing poorly at the 1988 Japanese Grand Prix at Suzuka, if he chose to compete at all. Only 30 minutes before the start of the Friday morning's practice session he was informed that his mother had died that morning (28 October). In the circumstances his effort in Saturday qualifying to equal his more illustrious team mate's time right down to the thousandth of a second was exceptional. Piquet and Nakajima qualified 5th and 6th respectively, Piquet in front only for having set his time earlier in the last qualifying session. Nakajima was actually  faster than the triple World Champion on the Friday, an effort that won the much-maligned Japanese driver new fans and much praise in the F1 paddock.

This left Nakajima and team-mate Piquet driving the Judd V8 powered Lotus 101 (Nakajima continued to wear Honda patches on his racing suit during the years he did not drive for a Honda-powered team). The pair had a very up-and-down season, with both failing to qualify for the 1989 Belgian Grand Prix, the first time in their 30-year history that Lotus had failed to make the grid, symbolically heralding the beginning of the end for the British team. A great upside to Nakajima's 1989 was a fourth place and fastest lap in the rain-soaked Australian Grand Prix, scoring his only points of the year and also equaling his best career finish, from the 1987 British Grand Prix. Nakajima's race in Adelaide, in which he was dead last at the end of the first lap after a spin soon after the start and only finished 4.648 seconds behind the 3rd placed Williams-Renault V10 of Riccardo Patrese, even drew praise from those who had criticised him in the past such as BBC television commentator and  World Champion James Hunt.

Nakajima joined Tyrrell for the  season (along with the promise of the team using the Honda V10 engine in ). He raced for them for two uneventful years at the back of the pack before ending his career. In 1990 he was team mate to young Frenchman Jean Alesi, who scored 13 points (including two second places) to Nakajima's three. In 1991 with the Honda engines used by McLaren in 1990 (and serviced by Mugen Motorsports), he was joined by Italian Stefano Modena. Nakajima was again outscored by his team mate, with Modena scoring 10 points and Nakajima's two points coming from finishing 5th in the opening race of the season in Phoenix.

Honda left Formula One a year later to lay the first bricks on a works team, one that they had been working on during the Formula One season, and that CEO Nobuhiko Kawamoto finally admitted to in October. The car, the Honda RC100 was unveiled to the media in February 1993, driven by Nakajima. Shortly afterwards, it passed the Fédération Internationale du Sport Automobile (FISA) crash tests, meaning that the company could enter their team into F1 competition. In an attempt to improve on their previous chassis, Honda built two more, the RC101 and 101B, the latter intended for racing purposes, the former for crash testing.  Nakajima had the first public testing of the 101B in Suzuka in January 1994. The company decided against entering its own cars in F1 at this time, instead opting to further their engine development in America with CART, and later, the IRL.

Personal life
Nakajima still lives in the family home near Okazaki. He owns the Nakajima Racing entry in Japanese Formula 3000 / Formula Nippon / Super Formula. Nakajima drivers have won the Formula Nippon championship three times, Tom Coronel doing so in 1999, Toranosuke Takagi in 2000, and Ralph Firman in 2002. Nakajima's current drivers are Takashi Kogure and André Lotterer, who finished second in the 2004 championship, although he was tied in points with champion Richard Lyons.

Nakajima's son, Kazuki raced for the Williams team in Formula One in the 2008 and 2009 seasons. Nakajima's younger son, Daisuke, is also a racing driver. He competed in the British Formula 3 Championship in 2009 and 2010. After their careers in open-wheel racing, both turned to sports car racing; Kazuki raced in the FIA World Endurance Championship with Toyota Gazoo Racing while Daisuke raced in Super GT; both have since retired from racing. Kazuki retired after the 2021 FIA World Endurance Championship to take up a managerial role with Toyota Gazoo Racing, while Daisuke retired at the end of the 2019 Super GT Series and has since maintained a low profile.

Racing record

Career summary

Japanese Top Formula Championship results
(key) (Races in bold indicate pole position) (Races in italics indicate fastest lap)

Complete International Formula 3000 results
(key) (Races in bold indicate pole position; races in italics indicate fastest lap.)

Complete Formula One results
(key) (Races in italics indicate fastest lap)

Helmet
Nakajima's helmet was white with two red lines forming a circular end on the chin area, with a wide line on the rear of the helmet with written NAKAJIMA on it. His son Kazuki Nakajima uses a slightly different version of this helmet.

Video games
Between 1988 and 1994, Nakajima endorsed many Formula One video games for various consoles like Family Computer, Sega Mega Drive, Game Boy and Super Famicom. While most of these games (released by Varie) were only released in Japan, one of the games Nakajima had endorsed for the Mega Drive was released internationally as Ferrari Grand Prix Challenge. He also appeared as a playable driver in his Lotus 100T in Codemasters' F1 2013.

References

External links
Nakajima Racing
 

1953 births
Living people
People from Okazaki, Aichi
Japanese racing drivers
Japanese Formula One drivers
Team Lotus Formula One drivers
Tyrrell Formula One drivers
European Formula Two Championship drivers
Japanese Formula Two Championship drivers
24 Hours of Le Mans drivers
International Formula 3000 drivers
World Sportscar Championship drivers
Sports car racing team owners
Grand Champion Series drivers
TOM'S drivers
Long Distance Series drivers